Anis Boujelbene (born 6 February 1978) is a Tunisian former footballer who played as a defensive midfielder.

Transfer to Al Ahly

He moved to Al Ahly in January 2007, after guiding his former club CS Sfaxien to the final of the CAF Champions League 2006, before losing out on the title to Al Ahly, his new employers.

His performances in Africa's top club competition earned him a return to the Tunisian national side after a four-year absence, his contribution having been noticed by Tunisian coach Roger Lemerre.

Boujelbene had been nominated for the title of best Tunisian player in the past. He led CS Sfaxien to win 6 titles during his captaincy.

Honours
with Al Ahly:
 Winner of CAF Super Cup 2007.
 Winner of CAF Champions League 2008.

Manager
He has managed US Ben Guerdane and CS Sfaxien.

References

External links

1978 births
Living people
People from Sfax
Tunisian footballers
Association football central defenders
Tunisia international footballers
2002 African Cup of Nations players
Tunisian expatriate footballers
Expatriate footballers in Egypt
Tunisian expatriate sportspeople in Egypt
Expatriate footballers in the United Arab Emirates
Tunisian expatriate sportspeople in the United Arab Emirates
CS Sfaxien players
Al Ahly SC players
Khor Fakkan Sports Club players
Club Africain players
Tunisian Ligue Professionnelle 1 players
Egyptian Premier League players
UAE Pro League players
Tunisian football managers
US Ben Guerdane managers
CS Sfaxien managers
Tunisian Ligue Professionnelle 1 managers